Pierre-Calixte Neault (December 26, 1860 – August 30, 1924) was a politician Quebec, Canada and a two-term Member of the Legislative Assembly of Quebec (MLA).

Early life

He was born on December 26, 1860, in Saint-Maurice, Mauricie.

City Politics

He served as Mayor of Grand-Mère from 1910 to 1916 and in 1919 and 1920.

Member of the legislature

Neault ran as a Liberal candidate in the district of in the provincial district of Champlain in 1900 and won.  He was re-elected in 1904 and 1908.

He lost re-election in 1912, against Conservative candidate Joseph-Arthur Labissonnière.

Death

He died on August 30, 1924, in Grand-Mère.

See also
Champlain Provincial Electoral District
Mauricie

References

1860 births
1924 deaths
Mayors of places in Quebec
Quebec Liberal Party MNAs